Penicillium flavigenum is a species of the genus of Penicillium which produces penitrem A, penicillin and roquefortine C.

See also
 List of Penicillium species

References

Further reading

 
 
 

flavigenum
Fungi described in 1997